Coast City is a fictional city in the state of California, created by John Broome and Gil Kane, which appears in stories published by DC Comics. It is depicted most often as the home of the Silver Age version of the superhero Green Lantern, Hal Jordan. Ferris Aircraft is one of the largest employers in Coast City.

Fictional history
Coast City, which first appeared in Showcase #22 in September–October 1959, is a city located in California. This makes it one of the few fictional cities in the DC Universe to have a specifically given location from the start.

Coast City is usually portrayed as an analogue of Los Angeles and San Diego. Green Lantern: Rebirth identifies it as being in Northern California, though recent issues of Green Lantern list it as being twenty miles from Edwards Air Force Base.

Destruction
In the 1990s, Coast City is destroyed, with nearly all of its residents – then numbered at seven million – by Mongul. Mongul's gigantic ship appears over Coast City and releases thousands of spherical bombs which detonate simultaneously. It is then revealed that Mongul is doing the bidding of former astronaut Hank Henshaw, better known as the Cyborg Superman. Mongul and Henshaw build the second Engine City in Coast City's ashes, as part of a plot to turn Earth into the new Warworld. The two intend to strike a double blow against the then-recently deceased Superman by claiming his world for themselves and framing him as the one responsible for his planet's destruction. This plan is stopped by Superman after his resurrection, with the help of Superboy, Steel, and Hal Jordan, who returned from space to find his home destroyed.

Killed in the blast are numerous supporting characters of the Green Lantern comic books, including Guy Gardner's girlfriend Kari Limbo  and several Ferris Aircraft employees. Jordan attempts to resurrect the city using his ring and learns that his first girlfriend also died in the blast, but his ring's power is revoked by the Guardians before he can make it last for more than a few moments.

In the near-future, a government time-travel experiment attempts to go back in time to prevent Henshaw becoming the Cyborg and destroying Coast City, but Booster Gold is forced to go back in time and stop the renegade time-traveler to preserve the timeline. During his time in the past, Booster saves a little girl who will go on to become his adopted daughter (after Skeets confirms that history has no record of her death in the city's destruction), as well as his time-lost sister Michelle Carter, but they are unable to save her then-boyfriend as history records that he died in the blast.

The city's destruction drives Hal Jordan to become the villain Parallax, due to a mental breakdown from grief, though it is later revealed that he is also under the influence of Parallax, a yellow emotional entity. Jordan slaughters nearly all the Green Lanterns, absorbs the energies of the Power Battery, and tries to rewrite history. This leads to the appointment of a new Green Lantern, Kyle Rayner. A memorial to Coast City's victims is erected on the site of the city with the help of most of the major superheroes of the period.

For a time, an alien city named Haven that crashed on Earth resides on top of the ruins of Coast City.

When Hal Jordan dies saving the world, the heroes memorialize him. An eternal flame is constructed in the ruins of the city. Swamp Thing uses his powers to fill the surrounding area with greenery.

When Hal Jordan from early in his career is pulled into the future during an encounter with Kyle Rayner, a version of Parallax from when he attempted to restart history tries to convince his younger self to go along with his plans by taking himself, his younger self and Kyle back to Coast City at the moment of its own destruction, freezing time in the second before the bombs strike. Despite his future self showing him the people who would die when the city is destroyed, the younger Hal refuses to go along with Parallax's plan. The two fight in the frozen city before Kyle convinces them that they both have to return to their own times.

The villain Remnant attempts to depict Superman as a devil by blaming him for the deaths caused in Doomsday's rampage, particularly the fact that so few people acknowledge the others who died in the fight in favour of 'focusing' on Superman's resurrection. Superman confronts a reporter writing an article about the anniversary of the rampage, complimenting him on his ability to challenge Superman with hard questions, and asks him to consider one final question: if Superman weren't around, would there be fewer Doomsdays (monsters seeking to confront him), or more Coast Cities (disasters that occur because Superman was not available to prevent them)?

It is later revealed that Hank Henshaw chose to destroy Coast City to erase his former life on Earth. He and his wife, Terri Henshaw, used to be residents of Coast City.

Reconstruction 
Coast City is subsequently rebuilt in the wake of Jordan's resurrection. While the Spectre, Hal Jordan, and the Parallax parasite are wrestling for control of the Spectre's powers, all roads, street signs, and Jordan's apartment reappear. 'Haven' also vanishes from the site.

Populating the rebuilt city becomes one of the latest initiatives of Jonathan Vincent Horne, President of the United States. Charities and industries around the world, including Wayne Enterprises, contribute to a fund for rebuilding the city. Despite all those efforts, Coast City remains a ghost town due to its reputation as the site of a mass murder. Among the exceptions is Hal Jordan, who lives there when he is not working at nearby Edwards Air Force Base as one of their test pilots. Hal's nephew attends a school with a student body of fewer than twenty.

The U.S. Navy establishes a presence in the region, as both a domestic security and economic stimulus measure.

One year after the events of Infinite Crisis, Coast City finishes reconstruction. During the Sinestro Corps War, it is targeted for destruction by Sinestro and the terrorist organization that bears his name. Hal Jordan uses his ring to contact every citizen, urging them to evacuate the city. En masse, they decide to stay. Many shine green lights from their homes to indicate their support. Jordan and Kyle Rayner defend the city from the rogue Corps' attacks, and Sinestro is defeated on the rooftops of Coast City.

In the aftermath, the city's population rises dramatically, and many businesses and citizens return. Available living space is rapidly filled. The new Coast City is dubbed "The City Without Fear" by the news media. The damage from the Sinestro Corps battle is repaired by the Green Lantern Corps and Earth's superheroes.

By the time of the Final Crisis, Coast City's population is cited on local promotional billboards as 2,686,164.

Blackest Night 
As of the beginning of the 2010 miniseries Blackest Night, the population increases to 2,765,321. A new memorial is erected to commemorate the city's history; it includes a green lantern, lighted by Hal Jordan, John Stewart, Guy Gardner, and Kyle Rayner. In the course of the story, the Black Lantern Corps' central power battery teleports to just outside Coast City, bringing forth the demon Nekron, (the black personification of Death and longtime enemy of the Green Lantern Corps) the undead Guardian Scar, and Black Hand. The Anti-Monitor also emerges from the battery but is defeated before exiting. Nekron then sends forth black rings into the city's memorial, reanimating the dead as Black Lanterns. Nekron is then defeated in the streets of Coast City.

The population is again shown at 2,765,321, as a murderous version of Bruce Wayne attacks the city. This Wayne, wielding a Green Lantern ring, disposes of Hal Jordan and sends demonic forms to attack the populace. A later view of Coast City shows many skyscrapers knocked off their foundation.

Alternate Versions
In an alternate future Coast City is once again abandoned after half of it fell into the ocean along with most of California. What remains is now the domain of Poison Ivy, who has turned it into a greenhouse paradise.

Geography
In the 1970s, an "Ask the Answer Man" column placed Coast City in California. The Atlas of the DC Universe, published by Mayfair Games in 1990, places Coast City in northern California, between San Francisco and Green Arrow's Star City.

Ferris Aircraft is an aerospace company which Hal Jordan works for as a test pilot, it is located twenty five miles out from the city. His romantic interest, Carol Ferris, is the company's manager. Coast City also includes an extensive beach, and is a popular spot for surfing. It also has a nearby mountain, called 'Mt. Pacific'.

When the city is destroyed, a news broadcast in the comic shows a map locating Coast City a little south of Santa Barbara, California.

In I, Vampire #3, which was part of the 2011 relaunch The New 52, Coast City is established to be in the Mountain Standard Time zone, making the city landlocked.

In other media

Television
 In the Smallville second-season episode "Redux", Clark says that his adoptive maternal grandfather retired with his wife to Coast City. In the seventh season of Smallville, Kara says she has just returned after spending a weekend with Jimmy Olsen in Coast City.
 Coast City briefly appeared in the Batman: The Brave and the Bold episode "Hail the Tornado Tyrant!". The Tornado Tyrant attempted to wipe it out with a massive tidal wave, but was stopped by Batman and Red Tornado. It also appeared in "Sidekicks Assemble!" by being the place where Ra's al Ghul infests the city with his evil plants. It later appears in "Scorn of the Star Sapphire" when the Zamarons take control of Carol Ferris.
 Coast City appears in Green Lantern: The Animated Series.
 Coast City is referenced in various TV series that take place in the Arrowverse:
 In Arrow, Coast City is mentioned in the episodes "Legacies", "The Huntress Returns", "Corto Maltese", and the season 3 finale "My Name is Oliver Queen". In "Legacies", Tommy Merlyn asks Laurel if she would like to go with him on his private jet to Coast City. In "The Huntress Returns", Oliver's detective girlfriend gets shot by Huntress and says she's going to move in with her sister in Coast City. In "My Name is Oliver Queen", during a flashback scene, Oliver is shown boarding a boat bound for Coast City; a flashback in "Green Arrow" shows Oliver adopting an early version of the Hood disguise in Coast City, running past an advertisement sign proclaiming "In brightest day, In blackest night, Come to Coast City, When money's tight". In the season 4 finale episode "Schism", John Diggle mentioned to Lyla that their daughter Sara is in an ARGUS bunker in Coast City.
 Coast City is mentioned in The Flash episode "Fallout" when Iris West asks Caitlin Snow where Ronnie Raymond is from. The city itself is also briefly seen for the first time in the Arrow/Flash universe (Arrowverse) in the episode "Who Is Harrison Wells?" when Barry Allen runs to the city to get pizza, allegedly the "best in the west". In the episode "Enter Zoom", Linda Park moved to the city after being kidnapped by Zoom and his battle with Barry. In the episode "Phantoms", Iris West and Sue Dearbon travel to Coast City where they're investigated Tinya Wazzo who's known as the Coast City Phantom. They learn that  she is searching for her birth mother who abandoned her. Iris convinces her to come with her and Sue. 
 Coast City was mentioned by Cisco Ramon in the third episode of Vixen.
 Coast City was mentioned in the episode "Progeny" of Legends of Tomorrow by Hawkman as another place to escape from Vandal Savage.
 Coast City was mentioned in the episode "Emergency Punch Up" of Powerless as a destination for the company's retreat.

Film
 Coast City is mentioned by name by Hal Jordan, in the animated film Green Lantern: First Flight, when he talks to Appa Ali Apsa. Hal compares Green Lanterns to cops in their precincts, and says his uncle was a cop in the Coast City police force.
 Coast City appears in the 2011 film Green Lantern with like in the books, Ferris Aircraft a primarily location. The name of the city appears during a television newscast and the base for the final climax between Jordan and Parallax.
 Coast City is mentioned in the 2014 film Justice League: War, but when mentioned and shown the location, Coast City appeared to be located somewhere in the southern half of Florida.
 A newspaper clipping of "The Coast City Ledger" is shown in a mid-credits scene of the 2018 movie Aquaman with Stephen Shin.

Video games
 In the Batman Begins video game, a corrupt police officer can be heard saying "Yeah, I bought the boat. Me and the wife are taking it over to Coast City next weekend".
 Coast City appears in DC Universe Online.
 Coast City is referenced in Batman: Arkham Origins. In Burnley, there is a billboard with the names of cities including Coast City.

References

External links
 Coast City at DC Wiki

Fictional populated places in California
Green Lantern
DC Comics populated places
1959 in comics

de:DC-Universum#Städte